The 9th Pennsylvania House of Representatives District is in western Pennsylvania.  As of 2023, it is represented by Marla Brown.

District profile
The 9th Pennsylvania House of Representatives District is entirely located within Lawrence County. It includes the following areas:

 Bessemer
 Hickory Township
 Mahoning Township
 Neshannock Township
 New Castle
New Wilmington
 North Beaver Township
 Pulaski Township
 Shenango Township
 S.N.P.J.
 South New Castle
Taylor Township
 Union Township
Wilmington Township

Representatives

Recent election results

References

External links
District map from the United States Census Bureau
Pennsylvania House Legislative District Maps from the Pennsylvania Redistricting Commission.  
Population Data for District 9 from the Pennsylvania Redistricting Commission.

Government of Lawrence County, Pennsylvania
9